Kurt Liederer (18 May 1927 – 15 May 2020) was an Austrian diver. He competed in the men's 10 metre platform event at the 1952 Summer Olympics.

References

External links
 

1927 births
2020 deaths
Austrian male divers
Olympic divers of Austria
Divers at the 1952 Summer Olympics
Place of birth missing